Jeff Rowe (born March 21, 1984) is a former American football quarterback. He was drafted by the Cincinnati Bengals in the fifth round of the 2007 NFL Draft. He played college football at Nevada.

He has also been a member of the Seattle Seahawks and New England Patriots.

Early years
Rowe attended Robert McQueen High School in Reno, Nevada and led his team to the 2001 state title game, his only season as the starter, throwing for 2,059 yards and 27 touchdowns.

College career
Rowe attended the University of Nevada. In his true freshman season of 2002, Rowe played in six games as the backup quarterback, throwing for 138 yards and one touchdown. In 2003, Rowe was named the most improved offensive back during spring drills and became the team's starter before suffering a shoulder injury early in the year. He threw for 259 yards and one touchdown and was redshirted for the season. In 2004, Rowe started all 14 games for the Nevada Wolf Pack, passing for 2,633 yards and 15 touchdowns, while rushing for another 129 yards. In his junior season in 2005, Rowe started all 12 games, throwing for 2,925 yards and 21 touchdowns. He also ran 119 times for 244 yards and six touchdowns. He earned second-team All-Western Athletic Conference honors and was his team's offensive most outstanding player. In 2006, his senior season, Rowe missed one game with a hamstring injury, but in his 12 starts he threw for 1,907 yards and 17 touchdowns. Following the season, he was named as the team's most valuable player. He compiled 7,862 yards in his college career, ranking him fifth in the school's history.

Professional career

Cincinnati Bengals
Rowe was selected by the Cincinnati Bengals in the fifth round (151st overall) of the 2007 NFL Draft and spent his rookie season as the team's third-string quarterback behind Carson Palmer and Ryan Fitzpatrick, but did not see any playing time.

Rowe began the 2008 season on the team's practice squad and remained there until being signed by the Seattle Seahawks on December 12.

Seattle Seahawks
Rowe was signed by the Seattle Seahawks on December 16, 2008 after offensive tackle Walter Jones was placed on injured reserve. He spent the offseason with the Seahawks before being waived on September 5, 2009.

New England Patriots
Rowe was signed to the New England Patriots practice squad on December 9, 2009. He was re-signed to a future contract on January 12, 2010. He was waived by the Patriots on May 21, 2010.

External links
New England Patriots bio
Nevada Wolf Pack bio

1984 births
Living people
Sportspeople from Reno, Nevada
Players of American football from Nevada
American football quarterbacks
Nevada Wolf Pack football players
Cincinnati Bengals players
Seattle Seahawks players
New England Patriots players